KYOR (88.9 FM) is a radio station broadcasting a religious format. Licensed to Newport, Oregon, United States, the station is currently owned by Family Stations, Inc. The station airs several Christian ministry broadcasts from noted teachers such as RC Sproul, Alistair Begg, Ken Ham, John F. MacArthur, Adriel Sanchez, Dennis Rainey, John Piper, & others as well as traditional and modern hymns & songs by Keith & Kristyn Getty, The Master's Chorale, Fernando Ortega, Chris Rice, Shane & Shane, Sovereign Grace Music, Sara Groves, & multiple other Christian and Gospel music artists.

References

External links

Newport, Oregon
Family Radio stations
YOR
2006 establishments in Oregon
Radio stations established in 2006